This is a list of seasons completed by the Nashville Kats. The Kats were a professional arena football franchise of the Arena Football League. The team was established in 1997. They made the playoffs in their first five years in existence. However, after the 2001 season, the Kats players and equipment became the nucleus of the Georgia Force AFL franchise, although the Kats' history remained in Nashville. After being dormant for three seasons, the Kats were resurrected in 2005. However, the Kats folded after the 2007 season due to box office struggles as the revived Kats never approached the popularity of the previous team. The Kats played in two ArenaBowls and they played their home games at Bridgestone Arena, formerly the Nashville Arena, Gaylord Entertainment Center, and Sommet Center.

References
General
 
 

Arena Football League seasons by team
Nashville Kats seasons
Tennessee sports-related lists
Nashville Kats